there were a total of 97 state-owned enterprises, also called public enterprises, in Namibia.

18 of the public enterprises are profit-driven and fall under the Ministry of Public Enterprises established in March 2015. Leon Jooste heads this ministry. The other state-owned commercial entities are mainly active in education, media, and transport. They execute state functions and fall under their respective line ministries. Some of the state-owned enterprises in Namibia are:

Former state-owned enterprises

The following companies were state-owned, and have been dissolved:

References

 
Companies
State-owned enterprises
State-owned
Namibia